308 Squadron may refer to:

 No. 308 Polish Fighter Squadron, a World War II Polish unit in the Royal Air Force
 308th Aero Squadron, an aero squadron in the  Air Service, United States Army
 308th Air Refueling Squadron, United States Air Force
 308th Fighter Squadron, United States
 308th Rescue Squadron, United States Air Force
  308th Troop Carrier Squadron, United States Army Air Forces
 VAK-308, United States Navy
 VAQ-308, United States Navy